Who'd Thought It was a farming community in northern Hopkins County, Texas. The community was located near Farm to Market Road 1536 east of Tira and north of Sand Hill. It was most likely settled after 1900; the origins of its name are unknown. Who'd Thought It had two stores and several houses at one point before World War II; the stores eventually closed, and by the 1980s Who'd Thought It had become a ghost town.

External links
 "WHO'D THOUGHT IT, TEXAS," Handbook of Texas

Ghost towns in East Texas
Geography of Hopkins County, Texas